Universitas Muhammadiyah Surakarta (UMS) is one of 164 universities of Muhammadiyah (PTM) and one of the 1890 private higher educational institutions (PTS) in Indonesia. Charity business education is determined to create a campus that promotes "Scientific and Islamic Discourse" to foster an Islamic culture that will instil in its students knowledge and skills based on Islamic values.

History 
Universitas Muhammadiyah Surakarta (UMS) is an institution of higher education under Persyarikatan Muhammadiyah. UMS stands on the Decree of the Minister of Education and Culture (Decree No. 0330/O/1981. October 24, 1981) which changed its name from IKIP Muhammadiyah Surakarta.

UMS is institutionally derived from the Faculty of Teacher Training and Education (Guidance and Counseling) Jakarta Muhammadiyah University of Surakarta Branch, which was established in 1957. The founders included Mother Sudalmiyah Suhud Rais, Radjab Month Hadipurnomo, Muhammad Syafa'at Habib, Sulastri Gito Atmodjo, and KH Syahlan Rosyidi, among others.

On September 18, 1958, the new university was inaugurated by the Mayor of Surakarta Municipality, Werdhisastro HM Salih. It had 51 students and 7 employed lecturers. Capital assets at inception were derived from  the FKIP Jakarta Muhammadiyah University of Surakarta Branch, located at Jalan Lieutenant Colonel Sudiarto No. 60 Surakarta.

The Dean of the college is Professor. Drs. Abdullah Sigit, Professor at University of Gadjah Mada University and the secretary Drs. M. Syafa'at Habib. The majors offered have opened up education in general and include, Public Economics and Islamic Studies, Islamic Religious Education – the bachelor's degree, all of which have a registered status.

In 1963, the majors were given the status equal to a diploma awarded at public universities (comparable to the Bachelor level) under the decree of the Minister of Higher Education and Science Number 106/A in 1963.

In 1965, the Guidance and Counseling Branch of Muhammadiyah Surakarta received permission to independently establish two Higher Education institutions, namely the Institute of Teacher Training and Education (Teachers' Training College) Muhammadiyah Surakarta, under the coordination of the Ministry of Higher Education and Science and the Institute of Islamic Muhammadiyah (IAIM) under the coordination of the Ministry of Religious Affairs. IKIP Muhammadiyah Surakarta standing with the General Education majors (PU), Public Economics (EU) based on the Decree of the Minister of High Education and Science (No. 337/B-SWT/1965), and IAIM with majors MT / Islamic Religious Education and Programs Ushuluddin / Comparative Religion Religion bersadarkan Ministerial Decree number 21 of 1966.

In 1967, Muhammadiyah Surakarta IKIP added a department of Civic Law (CH) with registered status as a parent and received permission from Muhammadiyah University of Central Java, consisting of Muhammadiyah IKIP Klaten, Magelang, Holy, Purwokerto, Kebumen, Wates, Waterford, Wonogiri, Sukoharjo, Karanganyar, Banjarnegara, Prambanan, Purbalingga, Wonosari, and Sragen. Once developed, the support these branches received was withdrawn as they had matured and could be run as independent colleges, such as Muhammadiyah Purwokerto Teachers' Training College, Teachers' Training College and Teachers' Training College Purworejo Muhammadiyah Muhammadiyah Magelang.

In 1979, Drs. H. Mohamd Djazman, then director of Muhammadiyah Surakarta IKIP, initiated the founding of Muhammadiyah University of Surakarta Muhammadiyah Surakarta by combining the Teachers' Training College and IAIM Surakarta. The initiative was later realized with a decree from the Minister of Education and Culture No 0330/O/1981 about the changing status of Muhammadiyah IKIP of Surakarta became Muhammadiyah University of Surakarta.

As a strengthening of institutions, UMS manages several faculties, namely Guidance and Counseling, the Faculty of Economics, the Faculty of Law, the Faculty of Engineering, and the Faculty of Religion of Islam (FAI). In 1983–1984, UMS opened the Faculty of Psychology and the Faculty of Geography.

In line with the demands and development of society, some faculties are developed by opening new departments such as the Faculty of Economics, Department of Economics of Development Studies, Faculty of Engineering with the Department of Architecture, Electrical, Chemical Engineering, and Industrial Engineering. In 1993–1994 UMS opened the Associate Expert Health Education program (D3) with the Department of Nursing, Physiotherapy, Nutrition, and Environmental Health. Year 1995–1996 opened the Graduate Program in the Masters program in Islamic Studies (MSI). Subsequently, the Faculty of Pharmacy and Master in Management (MM) was opened in 1999 and the Master of Legal Studies, Civil Engineering, and Management Education were opened in 2001. The Faculty of Health Sciences, majoring in Public Health, Nursing, Physiotherapy was opened in 2003–2004 S1 and D4, and following the Doctor of Education courses were opened in the academic year 2004–2005. In the development of four recent studies the program is integrated with the program D-3 with the name of the Faculty of Health Medicine. In 2005, UMS received permission to open the program to meet another master's degree in Psychology and Language Assessment Masters program in 2006. In 2006, the Teacher Training and Education Program opened a new department D2 Teacher Education Kindergarten (PGTK). In 2006 also opened the Faculty of Communications and Information Technology with a department of Communication Studies, followed by the opening of Informatics Engineering (Software) in 2007. In 2007 FKIP also opened a new department, namely the Primary School Teacher Education (PGSD). Year 2007 also marked with UMS step toward world-class university that is with the opening of the International program UMS cooperation with Kingston University in England to study automotive engineering program and UMS co-operation with University Kebangsaan Malaysia for a course of Business Administration and Medical Law. Until now, UMS manages 42 (forty two) courses of study and 2 (two) international programs. In addition, UMS also provides professional education for pharmacists, psychologists, lawyers, nurses, and teachers. The foundation for world-class university to become stronger with the inclusion of UMS in the 50 Promising Indonesian Universities.

Faculties
The university has 11 faculties:

 Faculty of Communication and Information
 Faculty of Economics
 Faculty of Engineering
 Faculty of Geography
 Faculty of Health Sciences
 Faculty of Islamic Religion
 Faculty of Law
 Faculty of Medicine
 Faculty of Pharmacy
 Faculty of Psychology
 Faculty of Teacher Training and Education

Master program
 Master of Civil Engineering
 Master of Islamic Studies
 Master of Languages and Literature Review
 Master of Management
 Master of Management Education
 Master of Psychology

Doctoral program
 Doctoral Program Legal Studies

External links
  Official website of Muhammadiyah University of Surakarta
  Official website of Faculty of Engineering
  Official website of Faculty of Communication and Informatics
  Official website of student admission

Universities in Jakarta
Muhammadiyah University